Lyons is an unincorporated community located near the Kansas City Southern rail line in Adair County, Oklahoma, United States.

References

Unincorporated communities in Adair County, Oklahoma
Unincorporated communities in Oklahoma